Giffords Circus is a traditional English circus that tours the Cotswolds every summer.   it is also performing at Chiswick House. 

Established in 2000, Giffords Circus is a small circus company, founded by Nell and Toti Gifford, that tours market towns of the Southwest. When not on the road, the founders concentrated on landscape architecture. 

Nell Gifford was the sister of designer Emma Bridgewater and journalist Clover Stroud. She died on 8 December 2019, aged 46, from cancer. The circus is now managed by her niece Lil Rice. and has been directed for the last 11 years by Cal McCrystal. 

Performers come from many different countries, but one regular is Tweedy the Clown (Alan Digweed) who was awarded the British Empire Medal in the 2023 New Year Honours list.

Tours
 2004: "Pearl"
 2006: "Joplin": with a 1960s theme
 2008: "Caravan": set in a horse fair around 1900
 2010: "Yasmine": inspired by the life of equestrienne Yasmine Smart, who played herself in the production
 2011: "War and Peace": themed around Napoleon's disastrous intrusion into Russia, seen through the eyes of a Russian aristocratic family
 2012: "The Saturday Book"
 2013: "Lucky 13": based on the culture clash resulting from a high art opera- and ballet-themed circus show that is gatecrashed by a rowdy Transylvanian travelling circus
 2014: "The Thunders": with the Greek Gods as its theme
 2015: "Moon Songs": blending cultural images of the moon with the story of two young Ethiopian jugglers dreaming of fame
 2016: "The Painted Wagon": centred on a group of 19th-century American homesteaders
 2017: "Any Port in a Storm": with maritime themes, and telling the story of the circus visiting the 17th-century Spanish court
 2018: "My Beautiful Circus": celebrating 250 years of the invention of the circus as an art form
 2019: "Xanadu": with a 1960s hippy "Summer of Love" theme
 2020: "The Feast": a non-touring show due to the COVID-19 pandemic
 2021: "The Hooley" was an Irish dance themed show.
 2022: "Carpa" had a Mexican theme.
 2023: "Les Enfants Du Paradis".

References

External links
 
 BBC review, 2004

2000 establishments in England
Circuses
Performing arts in England